Matina may refer to:

Places
Matina, Bahia, Brazil
Matina (canton), in the Limón province of Costa Rica
Matina District
Raid on Matina, or the Battle of Matina, in 1747
Matina (Maglaj), Bosnia and Herzegovina
Matina, an area of Davao City, Philippines
Matina River, in Costa Rica

People
Matina Brothers, or Matina Midget Troupe, a Hungarian-born trio of American entertainers in the early 20th century
Matina Horner (born 1939), an American psychologist 
Matina Kolokotronis (born 1964), an American basketball executive

Other uses
Matina (record label), founded by Kisaki

See also